HD 97413 is a binary star located in the southern constellation Centaurus. The system has a combined magnitude of 6.27, placing it near the limit for naked eye visibility. Based on parallax measurements from the Gaia spacecraft, the system is located 320 light years away from the Solar System.

The objects binarity was detected in a Hipparcos survey. Nevertheless, speckle interferometry revealed the components to have a 2.6 magnitude difference. They are located along a position angle of 250°. 

The visible component – HD 97413 A – has a stellar classification of A1 V, indicating that it is an ordinary A-type main-sequence star. However, this is not typical for an A1 star. Parameters determined by Gaia's extinction reveal HD 97413 A to have an iron abundance half of the Sun's, making it metal deficient.

References

Centaurus (constellation)
A-type main-sequence stars
CD-45 06771
097413
054718
Binary stars
Centauri, 7